Weston, Illinois may refer to:

 Weston, DuPage County, Illinois - a now-defunct town in Dupage County that voted itself out of existence to provide a location for the Fermilab National Accelerator Laboratory.
 Weston, McLean County, Illinois - a tiny village in unincorporated McLean County.